Nitro is a Canadian action drama film, directed by Alain DesRochers and released in 2007. The film stars Guillaume Lemay-Thivierge as Max, a former drag racer who is forced to return to his criminal past when his girlfriend (Myriam Tallard) requires a heart transplant. The film also stars Lucie Laurier as Morgane, a female drag racer who assists Max in his quest to locate a suitable organ for his girlfriend's surgery.

The film opened in theatres on June 29, 2007. Despite showing only in Quebec theatres at that point, it was so popular in its opening weekend that it ranked fifth at the Canadian box office.

A sequel film, Nitro Rush, was released in 2016.

Awards

References

External links
 

2007 films
2007 action drama films
Films directed by Alain DesRochers
Canadian action drama films
Canadian auto racing films
Films shot in Quebec
Films set in Quebec
French-language Canadian films
2000s Canadian films